The Mahakam River (Indonesian: Sungai Mahakam) is third longest and volume discharge river in Borneo after Kapuas River and Barito River, it is located in Kalimantan, Indonesia. It flows  from the district of Long Apari in the highlands of Borneo, to its mouth at the Makassar Strait.

The city of Samarinda, the provincial capital of East Kalimantan, lies along  from the river mouth.
The delta Mahakam river consist of specific micro climate which is influenced by high and low tide at sea level.

Summary
The Mahakam River  is the largest river in East Kalimantan, Indonesia, with a catchment area of approximately 77,100 km2. The catchment lies between 2˚N to 1˚S latitude and 113˚E to 118˚E longitude. The river originates in Cemaru from where it flows south-eastwards, meeting the River Kedang Pahu at the city of Muara Pahu. From there, the river flows eastward through the Mahakam lakes region, which is a flat tropical lowland area surrounded by peat land. Thirty shallow lakes are situated in this area, which are connected to the Mahakam through small channels . Downstream of the connection with the Semayang and Melintang lakes, the Mahakam meets three other main tributaries – the rivers Belayan, Kedang Kepala, and Kedang Rantau – and flows south-eastwards through the Mahakam delta distributaries, to the Makassar Strait.

Geology
Kalimantan, where the Mahakam lies, is part of the Sunda Continental Plate. The large island has mountain ranges between Indonesia and Malaysia. As described by van Bemmelen (1949), River Mahakam rises in Cemaru in the center of Kalimantan, from there it cuts through the pre-tertiary axis of the island east of the Batuayan and then reaches the tertiary basin of Kutai. Its middle course traverses a lowland plain with many marshy lakes. This intermontane depression is separated from the neighboring basin, the Barito depression, by a broad hilly tract of less than  altitude.

Upstream of Long Iram (upstream part of Mahakam river basin) the river is flowing in tertiary rocks (Voss, 1983). Between Long Iram and Muara Kaman (middle Mahakam area) the river is flowing in quaternary alluvium, while in the downstream area between Muara Kaman and the coast including the Mahakam delta, tertiary rocks are again present. The presence of the large delta is explained by the formation and rejuvenation of the hilly region near Samarinda.

Climate
The Mahakam catchment is around the equator. The average annual rainfall in the catchment area is 3163 mm. The average runoff is around 1911 mm. According to Köppen climate classification, this area belongs to type Af (tropical rainforest) that has a minimum temperature ≥18 °C and precipitation of the driest month in normal year ≥60 mm Transfer of mass and energy in the tropical zone occurred through general air circulation known as the Hadley cell. According to Seidel et al. (2008) the precipitation pattern in this area is largely determined by this large-scale atmospheric wind patterns, which is observable in several ways throughout the atmosphere. This circulation carries moisture into the air, generating rainfall in equatorial regions, whereas at the edges of the tropical belt are drier. Within this circulation, evaporation occurs intensively around the equator on the center of low pressure called the Intertropical Convergence Zone (ITCZ), characterized by accumulation of cloud in the area. The ITCZ moves following the pseudo-motion of the sun within 23.5°N and 23.5°S zone, therefore its position always changes according to this motion.

The ITCZ drives the Indo-Australian monsoon phenomena which influence the regional climate including the Mahakam catchment. In December, January, February (winter in Northern Hemisphere) the concentration of high pressure in Asia and low pressure in Australia make the west wind blows in Indonesia (west monsoon). In June, July, August concentration of low pressure in Asia (summer in Northern Hemisphere) and concentration of high pressure in Australia make the east wind blows in Indonesia (east monsoon). Due to the global air circulation and the regional climate mentioned above, the Mahakam catchment which is located around the equator has a bimodal rainfall pattern with two peaks of rainfall, which are generally occurred in December and May. This is because the ITCZ passed through the equator twice a year, from the Northern Hemisphere in September and from the Southern Hemisphere in March.

Lakes

There are about 76 lakes spread in the Mahakam river basin and about 30 lakes are located in the middle Mahakam area including the three main lakes (Lake Jempang 15,000 Ha; Lake Semayang 13,000 Ha; Lake Melintang 11,000 Ha). The lakes levels are seasonally fluctuated from 0.5 m – 1 m during dry period to seven meters during rainy season. The Mahakam lakes and surrounding wetlands act as water storage  as well as a trap of sediment contained in the water flowing into the lakes which are now known to become shallower, presumably as a result of an imbalance between sediment input and slow subsidence.

Fishing is the primary source of livelihood in the Mahakam lakes area, most of the people around the lakes are fishermen. The middle Mahakam lake area is an area of intensive fishing activity with a productivity of 25,000 to 35,000 metric tons per year since 1970.

Delta

The Mahakam delta is a mixed fluvial-tidal dominated delta. Fishery development in this area has converted a vast area of mangrove into shrimp ponds (tambak). However, recent mangrove restoration efforts have taken place in the delta by replanting mangroves in abandoned shrimp ponds and encouraging silvofishery. Many areas in the Mahakam delta are already naturally recolonized by mangrove vegetation contributing to ecosystem restoration. Mangroves also function as sedimentation enhancing strategies by capturing sediment causing accretion.

The delta has three main distributaries system directed Northeast, Southeast and South. The area between distributaries consists of a series of tidal channels generally unconnected to the main distributaries.

This lower Mahakam area is the second most productive hydrocarbon basin of Indonesia which contains around 3 billion barrels of oil and 30 Tcf of gas reserves. Production started in 1898 followed by expansion of exploration to the entire Mahakam.

Ecology

Mahakam and its floodplain is an ecologically important region. A total of 147 indigenous freshwater fish species had been identified from the Mahakam. The Mahakam hosts the freshwater dolphin Irrawaddy dolphin (Orcaella brevirostris; called Pesut by local people) a critically endangered species, which is included on CITES (Convention on International Trade in Endangered Species of Wild Fauna and Flora) Appendix I. The Mahakam river basin is also an important breeding and resting place for 298 bird species, among them 70 protected and five endemic species: Borneo dusky mannikin (Lonchura fuscans), Borneo whistler (Pachycephala hypoxantha), Bornean peacock-pheasant (Polyplectron schleiermacheri), Bornean blue-flycatcher (Cyornis superbus) and Bornean bristlehead (Pityriasis gymnocephala).

A research cluster: "Upsetting the balance in the Mahakam Delta: past, present and future impacts of sea level rise, climate change, upstream controls and human intervention on sediment and mangrove dynamics" extensively carry out research on the Mahakam. The cluster's objective is to study the impact of external forcing factors such as sea-level rise, climate change, upstream sediment, as well as human interference on past, present and future development of the Mahakam delta in different time scales.

Pollution
Logging and mining activities have contributed to the "alarming rate" of pollution of East Kalimantan's Mahakam River. Tests of water pollutants showed levels increased sharply between 2009 and 2011. Despite the growing pollution, it is claimed that "the water is basically still safe for consumption."

Unsafe concentrations of heavy metals have been observed in Mahakam fish. A 2015 study found lead concentrations in excess of 1000 times safe levels along with unsafe levels of copper, zinc, and cadmium.

Bridges
Bridges include the  Mahakam Bridge and the  Kutai Kartanegara Bridge. The latter collapsed on 26 November 2011, it took 3 years of planning and one and half years more to rebuild new bridge on the same spot. The new Kutai Kertanegara Bridge has been open for public use since 8 December 2015, after an opening ceremony held by a local regent.

Social aspect

The River Mahakam is an economic resource for fishermen and farmers, and as freshwater source, as a waterway since ancient time until today. It is in this river basin where the Kutai kingdom evolved. The Kutai history is divided into two periods, Kutai Martadipura (around 350–400 AD) and Kutai Kartanegara period (around 1300). Kutai Martadipura, a Hindu kingdom founded by Mulawarman at Muara Kaman, is regarded as the oldest kingdom in Indonesia. Kutai Kartanegara was founded by settlers from Java at Kutai Lama near the mouth of Mahakam. In around 1565, Islam was extensively spread in Kartanegara by two Moslem preachers from Java, Tunggang Parangan and Ri Bandang.

The Dayaks are the indigenous people inhabiting Kalimantan beside the Kutais and the Banjars. Since the 1970s transmigration of people to East Kalimantan was organized by the Indonesian government especially in areas near River Mahakam. Transmigration aims to migrate people from overpopulated Java, Bali, and Madura islands to stimulate greater agricultural productivity in outer islands. By 1973, almost 26% of the land under cultivation in East Kalimantan was being worked by transmigrants.

References

Rivers of East Kalimantan
Landforms of East Kalimantan
Rivers of Indonesia